Ivy Frances Klein (née Salaman; 23 December 1895 – 25 March 1972) was a British composer, pianist, and singer. She is best known for her settings of Early Modern and Romantic poetry.

Biography
Ivy Frances Salaman was born in 1895 to British Jewish parents Edmund Vannutelli Salaman and Edith Bessie Salaman, who were first cousins. Her father worked in the soap manufacturing industry, and by 1916 served as Vice Chairman of Hazlehurst & Sons. Her maternal grandfather was composer and pianist Charles Kensington Salaman.

Salaman studied harmony and composition in Liverpool under Arthur Wormald Pollitt from 1912 to 1915, and published her first songs in 1921. In 1923, she began studying composition with Benjamin Dale at the Royal Academy of Music, and receiving private vocal lessons from Anne Thursfield.

Her musical setting of Lord Byron's She Walks in Beauty was presented to the Queen and played during the Coronation month of 1953.

Partial bibliography

References

1895 births
1972 deaths
20th-century British composers
20th-century British Jews
British women classical composers
English classical composers
English people of Dutch-Jewish descent
English people of German-Jewish descent
Jewish classical composers
Jewish classical pianists
Jewish English musicians
Musicians from London
Salaman family
Singers from London